Sterr is a surname. Notable people with the surname include:

Gil Sterr, American football player
Hans Sterr (1933–2011), German wrestler
Heinrich Sterr (1919–1944), German World War II flying ace